The 2021 Africa U-17 Cup of Nations was planned to be the 14th edition of the Africa U-17 Cup of Nations (19th edition if tournaments without hosts are included), the biennial international youth football tournament organized by the Confederation of African Football (CAF) for players aged 17 and below. Cameroon would have been the defending champions. In September 2018, it was decided that the tournament would be hosted by Morocco. This would have been the first edition of the Africa U-17 Cup of Nations to have expanded to twelve teams instead of eight. The top four teams of the tournament would have normally qualified for the 2021 FIFA U-17 World Cup in Peru as the CAF representatives. However, FIFA decided on 24 December 2020 to cancel the tournament due to the COVID-19 pandemic.

The tournament was originally scheduled to be held between 13 and 31 March 2021. However, on 8 March 2021, CAF announced that the tournament had been cancelled due to the COVID-19 pandemic in Africa. Zambia offered to host the tournament at a later date to be agreed upon with CAF. However this never materialised.

Qualification

The CAF decided in July 2017 that the format of the qualifying competition should be changed and split according to zones. At the end of the qualification phase, eleven teams will join the hosts Morocco.

Player eligibility
Players born 1 January 2004 or later are eligible to participate in the competition.

Qualified teams
The following twelve teams qualified for the final tournament.

Note: All appearance statistics count only those since the introduction of final tournament in 1995.

Draw
The draw of the final tournament was held on 24 February 2021, 13:00 WAT (UTC+1),  . The twelve teams were drawn into three groups of four teams.

Match officials

Group stage

The top two teams of each group advance to the quarter finals along with the two best 3rd placed teams.

Tiebreakers

Teams are ranked according to points (3 points for a win, 1 point for a draw, 0 points for a loss), and if tied on points, the following tiebreaking criteria are applied, in the order given, to determine the rankings (Regulations Article 71):
Points in head-to-head matches among tied teams;
Goal difference in head-to-head matches among tied teams;
Goals scored in head-to-head matches among tied teams;
If more than two teams are tied, and after applying all head-to-head criteria above, a subset of teams are still tied, all head-to-head criteria above are reapplied exclusively to this subset of teams;
Goal difference in all group matches;
Goals scored in all group matches;
Drawing of lots.

All times are in WAT (UTC+1).

Group A

Group B

Group C

Ranking of third-placed teams

Knockout stage

Quarter finals

Semi finals

Third place

Final

Goalscorers

Broadcasting
 - EPTV
 - TPA
 - CRTV
 - SNTV
 - SABC

Final standings
Per statistical convention in football, matches decided in extra time are counted as wins and losses, while matches decided by a penalty shoot-out are counted as draws.

|-
| colspan="11"| Eliminated in the quarter-finals
|-

|-
| colspan="11"| Eliminated in group stage
|-

|}

References

 
2021 FIFA U-17 World Cup qualification
U-17 Cup of Nations
Africa U-17 Cup of Nations
2021
2021 Africa U-17 Cup of Nations
Association football events cancelled due to the COVID-19 pandemic